Kenareh Rural District is a rural district (dehestan) in the Central District of Marvdasht County, Fars Province, Iran. At the 2006 census, its population was 20,024, in 5,070 families.  The rural district has 13 villages.

References 

Rural Districts of Fars Province
Marvdasht County